The Bride of Habaek is a South Korean television drama spin-off of the 2006 sunjung manhwa Bride of the Water God by Yoon Mi-kyung. The series stars  Shin Se-kyung in the titular role alongside Nam Joo-hyuk, Lim Ju-hwan, Krystal Jung and Gong Myung. The series aired on cable channel tvN every Monday and Tuesday at 22:55 (KST) from July 3, 2017 to August 22, 2017.

Synopsis 
When the god of the Land of Water, Lord Ha-baek (Nam Joo-hyuk) visits earth to retrieve the sacred stones needed for him to claim the throne of the Divine Realm, he seeks out the help of neuropsychiatrist So-ah (Shin Se-Kyung), the only remaining descendant from a middle-class family fated to serve him for generations. Because she doesn't believe he's a god and mistakes him for suffering from a mental illness, she initially resists him. However, after she meets the god of the Land of the Sky, Bi-ryeom, (Gong Myung), the goddess of the Land of Water, Mu-ra (Krystal), and the demigod Hu-ye (Lim Ju-hwan), she decides to aid him in his quest. 
.

Cast

Main

Shin Se-kyung as Yoon So-ah
 A neuropsychiatrist with her own practice, who is currently struggling and swamped with debt. She is an only child with a tormented past, due to her belief that she was abandoned by her father as a teenager, resulting in her attempt to commit suicide by jumping into the Han River. Although she was saved from drowning, she ends up developing hydrophobia, especially for cold water. She meets Ha-baek upon his arrival to earth and, while helping him adjust to the human world and retrieve the sacred stones, falls in love with him. Unknowingly to them both, she is destined to be his bride.

Nam Joo-hyuk as Ha-baek
 The god of the Land of Water and the rightful heir to the throne of the Realm of the Gods. He comes to earth, specifically modern-day Seoul, with the aim of obtaining the sacred stones. At the request of the high priest and upon temporarily losing his powers, he seeks out So-ah's help as the last remaining descendant of the family destined to serve him. During their quest he finds himself falling for her but struggles with his feelings due to his impending return to the Water Kingdom, in which she'll be left behind. His love for So-ah is criticised by those from the Divine Realm since he's been in love previously with a human woman but their relationship ended tragically because of her betrayal. 
 
Lim Ju-hwan as Shin Hu-ye 
Yoon Chan-young as young Hoo-ye.
 A demi-god disguised as the CEO of a resort and Ha-baek's main rival. His birth parents are relatively unknown, apart from his mother being a human woman and his father a god from the Divine Realm. Because of his nature, he was abandoned as a child and is seen as a disgrace to the Realm of the Gods. His curse is subjection to an endless, mortal life on earth and deathly powers. Although they start off on the wrong foot, he eventually forms a friendship with So-ah and falls in love with her.

Krystal Jung (credited as Jung Soo-jeong) as Mu-ra / Hye-ra
 The goddess of the Land of Water who has lived among humans for hundreds of years as a well-known actress. She initially has an unrequited love for Ha-baek and despises So-ah because of their relationship, but eventually develops feelings for Bi-ryeom.

Gong Myung as Bi-ryeom / Ahn-bin
 The god of the Land of the Sky and a familiar face from So-ah's past. He hates Hu-ye unbeknownst to those from the Divine Realm, including Ha-baek and Mu-ra, because he was responsible for the murder of a close friend when he was a child. He initially has an unrequited love for Mu-ra, but it is reciprocated by her as the series progresses and they spend more time together.

Supporting

Divine Realm
 Lee Geung-young as the high priest
  as Nam Soo-ri, Ha-baek's servant
  as Joo Kul-rin, the greedy god
 Kim Tae-hwan as Jin Kun

Human world
 Shin Jae-hoon as Yoo Sang-yoo
 Choi Woo-ri as Jo Yeon-mi
 Jung Dong-hwan as Chairman Shin Dong-man
 Bae Noo-ri as Shin Ja-ya, granddaughter of Shin Dong-man
 Song Won-geun as Secretary Min

Extended

Lee Ji-ha as So-ah's mother
Son Hyo-eun
Kwon Hyeok-soo
Jung In-tae
Jung Na-jin
Lee Joon-hee
Lee Kwang-se
Kim Soo-bin
Lim I-eun
Shim Tae-seon
Ji Sung-geun
Kim Mi-hye
Kang Moon-kyung
Park Yong-jin
Kim Bo-min as Min-i
 as manager Bang
Im Ji-Hyun as Nak Bin, Ha-baek first love 
Park Mi-na
Kang Jung-ho
Kim Sung-mo
Jung Ae-hee
Ham Kun-soo

Seo Jung-chun
Nam Eun-ji
Kim Eun-kyung
Choi Ji-won
Kim Kwang-hyun
Jung Chan-in
Baek Seung-joon
Seol Ka-eun
Jung Seo-woo
Jung Na-yong
Song Ji-woo
Kim Ae-rin
Lee Jae-baek
Son Kyu-won
 as Hye-ra's manager

Special appearances

Park Hee-von as Hyung Sik, Sang Yu's fiancée (Ep. 16)
Yang Dong-geun as Joo-Dong, an earth god (Ep. 9, 10 & 16)
Jo Jung-chi as painter (Ep. 1)
Yoon Jong-hoon as Ma Bong-yeol (Ep. 1–2)
Ga Deuk-hee as Bank employee (Ep. 1)
Kim Won-hae as Taxi driver (Ep. 7)
Nam Chang-hee as Skateboard tournament host (Ep. 2)
Jeon So-min as patient (Ep. 4)

Production

Development
First announced in 2015, the live action version of the manhwa was written by Jung Yoon-jung, writer of the dramas Arang and the Magistrate (2012), Monstar (2013) and Misaeng (2014). The series relocates the characters and story to modern-day Seoul. The first script reading took place on March 16, 2017 in Sangam-dong, Seoul, South Korea, with principal photography beginning the same month.

Original soundtrack
Part 1

Part 2

Part 3

Part 4

Part 5

Part 6

Ratings
In this table, the  represent the lowest ratings and the  represent the highest ratings.

References

External links
 

 

TVN (South Korean TV channel) television dramas
2017 South Korean television series debuts
2017 South Korean television series endings
Korean-language television shows
South Korean romantic fantasy television series
South Korean romantic comedy television series
Television shows based on manhwa
Television series by Studio Dragon
Television series based on Chinese mythology